Svetlin Ivanov Simeonov (born 24 August 1975 in Vratsa) is a retired Bulgarian football midfielder.

Career
In his career he played for Botev Vratsa, Russian side Alania Vladikavkaz, Lokomotiv Sofia, Turkish Adanaspor, Spartak Pleven, Dunav Ruse, Naftex Burgas and Chernomorets Burgas. Between 1995 and 1996 Simeonov is a part of Bulgaria national under-21 football team. For Bulgaria U21, Simeonov was capped eight times, scoring three goals.

References

External links
 footmercato profile

1975 births
Living people
Bulgarian footballers
Association football midfielders
First Professional Football League (Bulgaria) players
FC Botev Vratsa players
FC Spartak Vladikavkaz players
FC Lokomotiv 1929 Sofia players
PFC Spartak Pleven players
FC Dunav Ruse players
Neftochimic Burgas players
PFC Chernomorets Burgas players
Expatriate footballers in Russia
Expatriate footballers in Turkey
People from Vratsa